The Stockport Air Raid Shelters are a system of almost 1 mile of underground air-raid shelters dug under Stockport, six miles south of Manchester, during World War II to protect local inhabitants during air raids.

Four sets of underground air raid shelter tunnels for civilian use were dug into the red sandstone rock below the town centre. Preparation started in September 1938 and the first set of shelters was opened on 28 October 1939; Stockport was not bombed until 11 October 1940. The smallest of the tunnel shelters could accommodate 2,000 people and the largest 3,850. It was subsequently expanded to take up to 6,500 people.

In 1948, the shelters were sealed off from the public.

The largest of the Stockport Air Raid Shelters have been open to the public since 1996 as part of the town's museum service.

Tunnels

Brinksway
The Brinksway shelter in Edgeley had a capacity for 1,085 bunks and 1,735 seats.

The excavations for the shelter expanded upon the 17th-century Brinksway Caves, which had previously been used as a shelter by navvies working on the Stockport Viaduct.

Chestergate
The Chestergate Shelter is the largest and most well known of the shelters, originally able accommodate 3,850 people before an expansion doubled the capacity to 6,500.

The shelter was formally opened on 28 October 1939 by the Mayoress of Stockport.

Due to the 'luxurious' amenities such as 16-seater chemical toilets, electric lighting and a canteen, the shelter was dubbed by locals as the 'Chestergate hotel'.

The shelter was opened to the public in 1996 as a museum. In 2014, Stockport Metropolitan Borough Council announced plans to cut funding to the museum and place it under an independent trust. In 2019, several staff were placed on redundancy notice, with plans announced to cut opening hours the following year. The cut in opening hours and the installation of admissions charges were set to go ahead in April 2020.

Dodge Hill
The Dodge Hill shelter in Heaton Norris had a capacity for around 2,000 people.

In 2013, two youths became trapped in the tunnels for over three hours, resulting in over twenty firefighters and seven emergency vehicles attending to rescue them. The following year, over thirty five firefighters arrived to extinguish a fire possibly ignited by rough sleepers.

Fiction and media 
The air raid shelters were depicted in Geraldine O'Neills 2020 book The Nightingales in Mersey Square, written under the pen name Lilly Robbins. The book centred around two trainee nurses during the arrival of 1,200 evacuees from Guernsey.

During her research for the book, O'Neill visited the Stockport Air Raid Shelters in order to ensure the work was authentic.

References

External links
 Detailed historical record about Stockport Air Raid Shelters
 Daily Telegraph photo
 Detailed article on the shelter system, including underground photographs of the disused shelters

Subterranea of the United Kingdom
Air raid shelters in the United Kingdom
Museums in Greater Manchester
History museums in Greater Manchester
Military and war museums in England
World War II museums in the United Kingdom
Tourist attractions in the Metropolitan Borough of Stockport
Buildings and structures in Stockport